Princess Kunthon Thipphayawadi, former Princess Chanthaburi was a consort of Phutthaloetla Naphalai. She was the daughter of Phutthayotfa Chulalok, the first king of Siam, and his wife Chao Chom Manda Thongsuk (née Princess Khamsuk of Vientiane).

References

Thai princesses consort
18th-century Thai women
18th-century Chakri dynasty
19th-century Thai women
19th-century Chakri dynasty
Thai people of Laotian descent
1798 births
1838 deaths
Daughters of kings